Boruiyeh (also Romanized as Borūīyeh; also known as Būrrū’īyeh) is a village in Tujerdi Rural District, Sarchehan District, Bavanat County, Fars Province, Iran. At the 2006 census, its population was 85, in 20 families.

References 

Populated places in Sarchehan County